Kitse was a settlement in Valgjärve Parish, Põlva County in southeastern Estonia.

References

External links 
Satellite map at Maplandia.com

Villages in Põlva County